Peter Krieger (sometimes misspelled 'Kreiger') is an American professional ice hockey forward currently playing for HC Vítkovice Ridera. He won two National Championships with Minnesota Duluth in 2018 and 2019.

Career
Krieger attended Saint Thomas Academy, a Catholic military academy near his home town, and played on the ice hockey team for three years. After graduating in 2012, he continued his junior hockey career first with the Aberdeen Wings and then the Waterloo Black Hawks. After being a point per game scorer for nearly that entire five-year period, Krieger headed up to Alaska to begin his college career.

He debuted for the Nanooks in 2014, however, due to prior NCAA recruiting violations, Alaska was ineligible for the postseason that year. With Alaska eligible for the playoffs in his sophomore season, Krieger began to show the scoring touch he had possessed in juniors and led the club with 16 assists. Unfortunately, the Nanooks fell from 4th to 8th in the standings and were swept out in the first round.

After his second year, Krieger decided to transfer closer to home and join Minnesota Duluth. He sat out the next season per NCAA transfer requirements and then played his first game as a Bulldog in 2017. Krieger saw his goal totals explode with his new team, scoring nearly three times his totals as a sophomore. Krieger finished second on the team with 30 points, however, it was on the defensive end where Duluth made its name. UMD was one of the top teams in the country and, though they had a slightly disappointing regular season, they were still able to earn one of the final at-large bids for the NCAA tournament. Krieger helped his team earn four consecutive 1-goal victories to capture the National Championship. Krieger's scoring declined slightly in his final season but it didn't hurt the Bulldogs as UMD won a second consecutive NCAA championship. 

With his college tenure now over, Krieger headed to Sweden to kick of his professional career. He joined Västerviks IK of the second Swedish league and finished in a tie for the team lead in goals. Västerviks made the postseason that year, however, the playoffs were abruptly ended on March 15 due to the Coronavirus pandemic.

Krieger returned to North America and played with the Indy Fuel during the abbreviated 'Covid year'. He performed well enough to earn a stint with the Manitoba Moose but ended up finishing the year in the ECHL.

After things returned to normal following the COVID-19 vaccine rollout, Krieger travelled back across the Atlantic. He spent the 21-22 season with HKM Zvolen and led the club in both goals and points (tied). After helping Zvolen to a second-place finish in the regular season, Krieger was again their top scorer in the playoffs but couldn't prevent them from bring eliminated in the semifinals. After the year, Krieger was again on the move and signed with HC Vítkovice Ridera

Career statistics

Regular season and playoffs

References

External links

1993 births
Living people
American men's ice hockey centers
American men's ice hockey left wingers
Ice hockey people from Minnesota
People from Oakdale, Minnesota
Waterloo Black Hawks players
Alaska Nanooks men's ice hockey players
Minnesota Duluth Bulldogs men's ice hockey players
NCAA men's ice hockey national champions
Västerviks IK players
Indy Fuel players
Manitoba Moose players
HKM Zvolen players
HC Vítkovice players
American expatriate ice hockey players in Sweden
American expatriate ice hockey players in Canada
American expatriate ice hockey players in Slovakia
American expatriate ice hockey players in the Czech Republic